Meeme is an unincorporated community located in the town of Meeme, Manitowoc County, Wisconsin, United States. It is located at both the intersections of WIS-42 (which leads south to Sheboygan and north to Manitowoc and Sturgeon Bay) and CTH-XX (leading west to Kiel and east to Cleveland toward I-43)

Images

References

External links 

Unincorporated communities in Manitowoc County, Wisconsin
Unincorporated communities in Wisconsin